The Schutzmannschaft, or Auxiliary Police ( "protective, or guard units"; plural: Schutzmannschaften, abbreviated as Schuma) was the collaborationist auxiliary police of native policemen serving in those areas of the Soviet Union and the Baltic states occupied by Nazi Germany during World War II. Heinrich Himmler, head of the SS, established the Schutzmannschaft on 25 July 1941, and subordinated it to the Order Police (Ordnungspolizei; Orpo). By the end of 1941, some 45,000 men served in Schutzmannschaft units, about half of them in the battalions. During 1942, Schutzmannschaften expanded to an estimated 300,000 men, with battalions accounting for about a third, or less than one half of the local force. Everywhere, local police far outnumbered the equivalent German personnel several times; in most places, the ratio of Germans to natives was about 1-to-10.

The auxiliary police battalions (Schutzmannschaft-Bataillonen) were created to provide security in the occupied territories, in particular by combating the anti-Nazi resistance. Many of these battalions participated in the Holocaust and caused thousands of Jewish deaths. Usually the battalions were voluntary units and were not directly involved in combat. In total, about 200 battalions were formed. There were approximately 21 ethnic Estonian, 47 Latvian, 26 Lithuanian, 11 Belarusian, 8 Tatar, and 71 Ukrainian Schuma battalions. Each battalion had an authorized strength of about 500, but the actual size varied greatly. They should not be confused with native German Order Police battalions (SS-Polizei-Bataillone) which the Order Police formed between 1939 and 1945 and which also participated in the Holocaust.

The Order Police organized the Schutzmannschaften by nationality (see Belarusian Auxiliary Police, Estonian Auxiliary Police, Latvian Auxiliary Police, Lithuanian Auxiliary Police, and Ukrainian Auxiliary Police).

Formation
The Germans did not want to use local collaborators on a large scale as they were deemed to be unreliable and inferior (Untermensch). However, the rapid German advance in the Eastern Front and manpower shortages forced Germans to reconsider. Therefore, on 25 July 1941, Reichsführer-SS Himmler authorized creation of Schutzmannschaft. Initially, it was called Hilfspolizei, but Germans did not want to attach a reputable police title to this force. Schutzmannschaften was an integral part of German police structure and dealt with variety of issues, including everyday crimes (except when concerning German citizens). Initially, only a small fraction of local auxiliaries were armed. Due to limited supervision, particularly in rural areas, members of Schutzmannschaften had considerable power and there were frequent complaints of corruption and abuse.

Initially, Schutzmannschaften was organized based on existing police structures and spontaneous anti-Soviet groups that formed at the start of the German invasion of the Soviet Union. For example, in Lithuania, Schutzmannschaften absorbed units formed by the Provisional Government. Due to this legacy and its semi-military status, Lithuanians associated police battalions with their national aspirations of independent Lithuania. This caused a rift within German ranks: ideologues like Hitler and Himmler saw no place for Baltic nationalism within the Greater Germanic Reich, but the Nazis needed local collaboration and had to maintain at least a shadow of national institutions.

Local men joined Schutzmannschaften due to a variety of reasons. A number of them had prior police or military experience and wanted a job which paid steady wages and provided food rations. Joining the German war apparatus also provided certain privileges and protections for the men and their families (for example, exemption from forced labor). Pensions were available to family members of those killed in anti-partisan operations. Others were motivated by ideological reasons (antisemitism, anticommunism, nationalism) or by opportunities to loot property of murdered Jews. Captured Soviet POWs saw Schutzmannschaften as a way to avoid concentration camps. Such considerations attracted criminals and other opportunists. Most of them were young: in 1944, about half of Schutzmannschaften near Mir were under 25 years of age. Germans complained about their lack of training, discipline, and in some cases refused to supply them with weapons. During 1942, in compliance with orders to enlarge Schutzmannschaft, Germans began to force men to sign up for the service and eliminated service term limits (initially men signed up for one-year or six-month terms). There was a marked difference in attitudes of more enthusiastic early volunteers and later forced recruits. To increase their reliability, Himmler ordered the organization of NCO training, which would include political education, that lasted up to eight weeks.

Organization
The Schutzmannschaft comprised four sections:

 Schutzmannschaft-Einzeldienst (stationary regular police; patrolmen in cities and districts)
 Schutzmannschaft-Bataillonen (mobile police battalions for Nazi security warfare)
 Hilfsschutzmannschaft (reserve units – guarded POWs and carried out work-details)
 Feuerschutzmannschaft (fire brigades)

Police battalions

Organization

Police battalions were divided based on their intended functions into five categories:
Schutzmannschaft-Front-Bataillonen (combat)
Schutzmannschaft-Wach-Bataillonen (guard)
Schutzmannschaft-Ersatz-Bataillonen (reserve/replacement)
Schutzmannschaft-Pionier-Bataillonen (engineer)
Schutzmannschaft-Bau-Bataillonen (construction)

Each battalion had a projected number of four companies of 124 men each, one with a group of machine gun and three groups of infantry. In reality, the numbers varied greatly between occupied territories. Baltic (Lithuanian, Latvian, Estonian) battalions were commanded by a native, while Ukrainian and Belarusian battalions had German commanders. The battalions did not have a prescribed uniform and often used uniforms from pre-war national armies. They were identified by a white armband which usually had the inscription Schutzmann, a service number and location. In Directive no. 46, Hitler expressly prohibited Schutzmannschaft to use German badges of rank, the eagle and swastika emblem, or German military shoulder straps. However, members of Schutzmannschaften were eligible for various awards and decorations, including the Iron Cross and War Merit Cross. Schutzmannschaften were generally armed with confiscated Soviet rifles and some officers had pistols. Machine guns were used in anti-partisan operations and mortars were employed in the later stages of the war. In general, the battalions were poorly provided for, sometimes even lacking food rations, as priority and preference was given to German units fighting in the front lines.

Battalion numbers
The Schutzmannschaft battalions were organized by nationality: Ukrainians, Belarusians, Estonians, Lithuanians, Latvians, Tatars. Germans attempted to organize police battalions in occupied Poland, but did not find volunteers and had to use force in forming the single Polish Schutzmannschaft Battalion 202. The battalions were initially allotted numbers as follows (in brackets: re-allotted numbers in 1942; not all numbers were actually used):

 Reichskommissariat Ostland: battalions 1 through 50
 Lithuanian Auxiliary Police: battalions 1 through 15 (1–15, 250–265, 301–310)
 Latvian Auxiliary Police: battalions 16 through 28 (16–28, 266–285, 311–328)
 Estonian Auxiliary Police: battalions 29 through 40 (29–45, 50, 286–293)
 Belarusian Auxiliary Police: battalions 41 through 50 (46–49)
 Reichskommissariat Moskowien: battalions 51 through 100
 Reichskommissariat Ukraine: battalions 101 through 200
 Ukrainian Auxiliary Police (including Tatar units)

Activities and role in the Holocaust
The battalions were not confined to their locations and could be easily moved to locations far outside their home country. Since formation of the battalions was particularly slow in Belarus, many of them were first stationed there. One of the first tasks of the battalions was mass execution of Jews. Attached to Einsatzgruppen as needed, the battalions rounded up, executed, and disposed of Jews. For example, it is estimated that Lithuanian Schutzmannschaft killed 78,000 Jews in Lithuania and Belarus. The mass executions largely ceased by the end of 1941. By that time German advance into Soviet Union halted and Nazi officials considered using the battalions for more direct military duties. In particular, Franz Walter Stahlecker asked to relieve the 16th Army in the Demyansk Pocket. However, Hitler refused. In Directive no. 46, dated August 1942, he agreed to strengthen and enlarge Schutzmannschaft, but to use it only for Nazi security warfare and other auxiliary duties behind the front lines. Some battalions continued to participate in the Holocaust (guarding or liquidating Nazi ghettos). About 12,000 men guarded forced laborers (Soviet POWs, civilians, Jews) working on the Durchgangsstrasse IV, a major road from Lemberg to Stalino (now Donetsk). The issue of involving Schutzmannschaft in combat was revisited after the Battle of Stalingrad. Some Schutzmannschaft battalions in Estonia, Latvia, Ukraine and elsewhere were reorganized into Waffen-SS divisions wearing national insignia.

Deserters were a constant problem for the battalions. For example, some 3,000 men deserted Lithuanian Schutzmannschaft between September 1943 and April 1944. After the war, many former members of Schutzmannschaft fled to the West. A survey of about 200 men revealed that more than 30% had escaped from the Soviet zone. Western authorities showed much less interest in members of Schutzmannschaft than in German Nazis and did not prosecute them. Soviet Union persecuted members of Schutzmannschaft, often sentencing them to death. For example, in Lithuania, 14 men were sentenced to 25 years in Gulag in 1948, 8 men were sentenced to death in 1962, one man executed in 1979. After the dissolution of the Soviet Union, several former members of Schutzmannschaft were denaturalized by United States or Canada and deported back to their countries.

Ranks

See also
Walloon Guard—a collaborationist police unit in German-occupied Belgium

Notes

References

Bibliography

 
Police forces of Nazi Germany
Politics of World War II
Local participation in the Holocaust
Holocaust terminology
German words and phrases
Einsatzgruppen
Collaboration with Nazi Germany‎